St Gabriel's is an active English Anglican church in Blackburn, Lancashire. Designed by F. X. Velarde, St Gabriel's is regarded as a milestone in the development of Modern English ecclesiastical architecture. Constructed in the early 1930s, the building was the first Anglican place of worship designed by the architect.

History
The church was constructed between 1932 and 1934 to a design by the Liverpool-born architect F. X. Velarde, at a cost of £20,000. Built on a prominent site on the outskirts of the town of Blackburn, on what is now Brownhill Drive, at the time of its construction it sat within a contemporaneous 1930s housing estate. St Gabriel's Church of England Primary School is located within walking distance away in nearby Pleckgate.

Architecture

Constructed principally of brick, with internally rendered walls, wood block floor, St Gabriel's in its original form was widely cited as Velarde's masterpiece, but a range of issues with the building have made it subject to significant alteration since its completion. It was compared at the time of completion as bringing the architecture  of the modern cinema and visual language of its interior into church design. In 1969, major structural issues were discovered during the quinquennials, a five-yearly assessment of the church's fabric.

Interior
St Gabriel's had a highly decorated, polychromatic interior with chrome and stainless steel in contrast to the cream-coloured plaster of the "long tunnel nave" and spare fenestration. The fittings were designed by Velarde; a chrome reredos stood at the east end, cited as a precociously early use and adaptation of the then-new material. Between 1970 and 1971, architectural practice Grimshaw and Townsend proposed a programme of renovation and refurbishment. Approved and initiated, the works were completed in 1977. They included major structural and aesthetic alterations to the building, and changes to Velarde's original interior, resulting in the removal of the parapets, the reredos, and other original Modernist fittings. Subsequent to this, the church was removed from the National Heritage listing. The organ is by Messrs. Jardine & Co. Ltd.

Stained glass

In 1976, a pair of controversial stained glass windows, by the artist Brian Clarke, were installed into St Gabriel's. Commissioned to design stained glass for the baptistery, Clarke, then twenty-four years old, produced working studies for the slender, arched fenestration, fabricating and installing the windows himself in 1977. In 1978, Clarke and the restoration of St Gabriel's were the subject of the cover story of the journal Architectural Review with an artwork titled Velarde is Not Mocked. The windows, as part of the restoration, were designed in direct response to the architecture, making reference to elements of the original design of the building. Significant changes were made by the restoring architect to the building, and the interior and exterior elements were unsympathetically altered. Clarke's public attack on the treatment of Velarde's architecture by the restoring firm marked the end of his working in the Church of England.

See also

 List of works by F. X. Velarde

References

Further reading
 Wilkinson, Dominic; Crompton, Andrew. F. X. Velarde (2020). Twentieth Century Architects. Liverpool University Press; Historic England. 
 Stroik, D. (2015). Building the Modern Church: Roman Catholic Church Architecture in Britain, 1955 to 1975. By Robert Proctor. Ashgate Studies in Architecture. Burlington, Vt.: Ashgate Publishing Limited, 2014. Church History, 84(4), 922–923.

External links
 The Churches of F. X. Velarde. Lecture by Dominic Wilkinson for The Twentieth Century Society, 2020.

Gabriel's Church
Church of England church buildings in Lancashire
Diocese of Blackburn
20th-century Church of England church buildings
Modernist architecture in England
Art Deco architecture in England
F. X. Velarde buildings